DigiTimes is a daily newspaper for semiconductor, electronics, computer and communications industries in Taiwan and the Greater China region.  It was established in 1998.  The company is based in Taipei, Taiwan and currently has a daily newspaper in traditional Chinese as well as Chinese-language and English-language websites.

In Taiwan, the company claims to have over 1,300 member companies and offers various levels of membership, which allows members access to its news archive, preferential booking for events and, for the higher levels of membership, access to DigiTimes Research reports.

The newspaper is cited by various information technology media and blogs like CNN, ZDNet, Los Angeles Times, Laptop Magazine, Cnet and others.

See also
Media in Taiwan

References

External links
DigiTimes official website 
DigiTimes English - 

1998 establishments in Taiwan
Taiwanese news websites
Companies based in Taipei
Taiwanese companies established in 1998